Gravity is the third album from Crashcarburn, released in 2012.

Track listing

External links 
 www.crashcarburn.com

2012 albums
Crashcarburn albums